Amanoi is a five star franchise hotel belonging to the international group of Aman Resorts, located in Ninh Thuận Province, Vietnam. It opened in September 2013, and was Aman's 26th property to open around the world and the first in Vietnam.

Geography
Amanoi is situated between Vịnh Vĩnh Hy (Vĩnh Hy Bay) and the Núi Chúa National Park, nearby to unique rock formations, a marine reserve and dunes. The resort is located 55 kilometers south of Cam Ranh International Airport on the coastline south of Nha Trang.

Architecture and facilities
The 100-acre luxury hotel facility was built by Jean-Michel Gathy of Kuala Lumpur-based Deniston Architects. It includes a Central Pavilion, taking inspiration from a traditional Vietnamese communal hall. There are two swimming pools, one Cliff Pool next to the Central Pavilion and one at the Beach Club.

Amanoi includes 31 individual villas. It also includes five villas that have live-in chefs and butlers and are free-standing structures made to look like traditional Vietnamese village houses.

The Aman Spa, which is part of the resort, is surrounded by the National Park's hills.

Awards
Amanoi has won a variety of hotel industry awards, including:
Conde Nast Traveler - 2014 Hot List 
Travel + Leisure - It List: The Best New Hotels 2014 
Harper's Bazaar Singapore – Spa Awards 2014 
Andrew Harper – Grand Awards 2015 
World Travel Awards – Asia's Leading Boutique Resort 2016

External links

References

Aman Resorts
Hotels in Vietnam
Hotels established in 2013
Hotel buildings completed in 2013
2013 establishments in Vietnam